Julie Elizabeth Nelson  (born 4 June 1985) is an association football defender from Northern Ireland who plays for Crusaders Strikers. She represents Northern Ireland nationally as the record cap player.

Club career 
Nelson played for Crusaders Newtownabbey Strikers from 2002 to 2010, with whom she won multiple championships and took part in 2010–11 UEFA Champions League qualifiers. She scored her team's only goal in the tournament in a 6-1 draw against FCR 2001 Duisburg.  After stints in Iceland, England, and Scotland, where she won further trophies with Glasgow City F.C. and reached the last 16 and quarter-finals of the 2013–14 and 2014–15 UEFA Champions League, she returned to the Crusaders in 2016. She previously played for Durham, Everton, and Íþróttabandalag Vestmannaeyja.

International career 
Nelson made her international debut during the 2004 Algarve Cup.  Northern Ireland qualified for the 2011 World Cup in third place behind France and Iceland, 13 points behind Iceland. Nelson was used in all ten games and didn't miss a minute. In qualifying for the 2013 Euro, they got fourth place. This time, too, she didn't miss a minute. She scored two goals in ten games. Qualifying for the 2015 World Cup, she played for Northern Ireland in all ten games of which only the last was won against the Faroe Islands, and again not missing a minute. They also qualified for the 2017 Euro, this time winning both games against Georgia. Nelson played in the eight games and again didn't miss a minute.

In qualifying for the 2019 World Cup, Nelson was in the starting XI seven times and came on as a substitute once. On September 4, 2018, she made her 100th appearance for Northern Ireland, becoming the first player to reach that landmark. Nelson was awarded the British Empire Medal (BEM) in the 2021 Birthday Honours for services to women's football.

In qualifying for Euro 2022, Northern Ireland finished second behind Norway, ahead of Wales who tied on points. They drew 2-2 in Wales and ended the home game goalless, allowing them to win the tied draw on away goals. In the playoffs, they prevailed with two victories (2-1 and 2-0) against Ukraine, who are higher in the FIFA world rankings, and qualified for a major football tournament for the first time. Nelson played in all ten games and didn't miss a minute. In the first game of Group A on July 7, 2022 in Southampton, she scored the first goal for the Northern Ireland national team in a major women's football tournament by scoring in the 49th minute in a 4-1 defeat by the Norwegian national team. With the same goal, Nelson also became the oldest woman to score in history of the Euros at 37 years and 33 days.

In the first eight matches of the qualification for the World Cup 2023, she played in all the games except the second match against the national team of Latvia.

Managing 
Nelson is interim manager for the U-17 Northern Ireland national team. She took over for Noel Mitchell in February 2023, while still playing on the senior Northern Ireland team.

Honours 
with Glasgow City
 Scottish Women's Premier League: 2013, 2014
 Scottish Women's Cup (2): 2013, 2014
 Scottish Women's Premier League Cup: 2014

 with Íþróttabandalag Vestmannaeyja
 Úrvalsdeild runner-up: 2012

 with Crusaders Strikers
 Women's Premier League: 2002, 2003, 2005, 2009, 2010

References

External links 
 
 Glasgow City player profile

1985 births
Living people
Íþróttabandalag Vestmannaeyja players
Everton F.C. (women) players
Glasgow City F.C. players
Expatriate sportspeople from Northern Ireland in Iceland
Women's association footballers from Northern Ireland
Northern Ireland women's international footballers
FA Women's National League players
Expatriate women's footballers in Iceland
Women's association football defenders
Durham W.F.C. players
FIFA Century Club
Recipients of the British Empire Medal
UEFA Women's Euro 2022 players
People educated at Larne Grammar School